Gita Dodova (born 2 May 1982 in Plovdiv) is a Bulgarian triple jumper. She competed at the 2008 Olympic Games without reaching the final. Her personal best jump is 14.24 metres, achieved in July 2008 in Argos Orestiko.

References

Profile at Sports-Reference.com

1982 births
Living people
Bulgarian female triple jumpers
Athletes (track and field) at the 2008 Summer Olympics
Olympic athletes of Bulgaria
People from Vratsa